The Connellsville Cokers, based in Connellsville, Pennsylvania, USA, were a professional minor league baseball team that played in the Western Pennsylvania League in 1907, the Pennsylvania–West Virginia League in 1908 and 1909 and the Ohio–Pennsylvania League in 1912. An un-nicknamed Connellsville team then played in the PWVL in 1914. They were the first professional baseball team to be based in Connellsville.

Notable players include major leaguers Roy Ellam, Hi Myers and Huck Wallace.

References

Ohio-Pennsylvania League teams
Pennsylvania-West Virginia League teams
Western Pennsylvania League teams
Baseball teams established in 1907
Baseball teams disestablished in 1914
1907 establishments in Pennsylvania
1914 disestablishments in Pennsylvania
Defunct baseball teams in Pennsylvania